Marie Frances Moralee (born 26 June 1971) is an English former cricketer who played as an all-rounder. She appeared in three One Day Internationals for England in the 1991 European Women's Cricket Championship. She took three wickets for just six runs on debut against The Netherlands. Across her three matches she took three wickets, scored 25 runs and took two catches. She played county cricket for Kent.

References

External links
 
 

1971 births
Living people
Sportspeople from Kent
England women One Day International cricketers
Kent women cricketers